Omiodes sauterialis is a moth in the family Crambidae. It was described by Strand in 1918. It is found in Taiwan . However, it is not listed on the Wikipedia page 'Moths of Taiwan, and there appears to be no photo of it, so its existence is questionable.

References

Moths described in 1918
sauterialis